The 2015 Asian Judo Championships were the 21st edition of the Asian Judo Championships, and were held in Kuwait City, Kuwait from May 13 to May 15, 2015.

Medal summary

Men

Women

Medal table

Participating nations 
206 athletes from 30 nations competed.

 (3)
 (1)
 (13)
 (14)
 (4)
 (14)
 (5)
 (3)
 (14)
 (5)
 (13)
 (8)
 (12)
 (5)
 (3)
 (14)
 (6)
 (7)
 (2)
 (2)
 (5)
 (13)
 (5)
 (2)
 (7)
 (8)
 (5)
 (1)
 (10)
 (2)

References
 Final Results AJC - 2015 Kuwait
 www.ippon.org

Asian Championships
Asian Judo Championships
Judo
Asian